The 2017 Minivan Championship Football Tournament is the third season under its current tournament format. The tournament began on March 15.

Structure
Minivan Championship will be played for two stages.

Zone stage
 Zone 1—8 includes clubs from all atolls of the Maldives.
 Each zone consists of different Atolls.
 Atolls will play separate competitions.
 All atoll champions from each zone will play separate competitions. 
 Champion teams of all zones qualify for final stage.

Final stage
 4 teams qualified for this stage divided into two even groups.
 Teams play against each other once.
 Top two teams of each group advance into semi-finals.
 Four semi-finalists qualify to this year's Dhivehi Premier League.

Teams
A total of 75 teams entered the competition this year.

Zone stage

Zone 1

Zone 2

Zone 3

Zone 4

Zone 5

Zone 6

Zone 7

Zone 8

Final stage

Group stage

Group A

Group B

Semi-finals

Final

References
 ފުޓްބޯޅައިގައި އަތޮޅުތަކުގެ ބައިވެރިވުން ބޮޑުކުރަނީ Mihaaru Sports (Dhivehi)
 ބޮޑު ބަދަލަކާ އެކު ފުޓްބޯޅަ ސީޒަން ހުޅުވުން އަންނަ މަހު 16 ގައި Mihaaru Sports (Dhivehi)
 އަތޮޅުތަކުގެ ގަދަ ހަތަރެއް ދިވެހި ޕްރިމިއާ ލީގަށް Mihaaru Sports (Dhivehi)
 މިނިވަން ޗެމްޕިއަންޝިޕް މާޗު މަހު، ބައިވެރިވާން ހުޅުވާލައިފި Mihaaru Sports (Dhivehi)
 މިނިވަން ޗެމްޕިއަންޝިޕްގައި މި ފަހަރު 75 ޓީމް Mihaaru Sports (Dhivehi)
 ފުޓްބޯޅަ މާކެޓްކުރަން ބޮޑު ބަޖެޓެއް، ވަރުގަދަ ޓީމެއް Mihaaru Sports (Dhivehi)
 މިނިވަން ޗެމްޕިއަންޝިޕާއި މާލޭ ލީގުގެ ސްޕޮންސަރަކަށް އެސްޓީއޯ Mihaaru Sports (Dhivehi)
 މިނިވަން ޗެމްޕިއަންޝިޕް ފަހު ބުރު ބާއްވަން ހަ ރަށަކުން ބިޑްކޮށްފި Mihaaru Sports (Dhivehi)

2017 in Maldivian football